Mosa Ghawsi (born 11 March 1989), known professionally as Malik Montana, is a German-Polish rapper of Afghan origin. He began making music in 2008, releasing his debut album, Naajak, in 2016. It would be followed by the release of Haram Masari in 2017, Tijara and 022 in 2018, and Import/Export in 2019.

Born in Hamburg, Mosa would move to Warsaw at the age of 15. He would begin making English-language music in 2008, making his debut in Polish rap in 2015.

Early life 
Mosa Ghawsi was born in 1989 in Hamburg. His father was from Afghanistan, while his mother was Polish-Greek. According to an interview with PopKiller, he traveled with his brother at the age of 15 to Poland, settling in the Wrzeciono neighborhood of Bielany, a district in Warsaw.

Career

=Music
Mosa began to make music under the pseudonym Malik Montana in 2008; the last portion of the pseudoym, "Montana", is derived from the Scarface character Tony Montana. Early on in his career, he would make English-language hip-hop songs with the German rapper Sentino; he would continue to make songs in English until 2012, when he began to appear in foreign concerts within Poland.
 
On 20 October 2015, he made his debut in Polish rap with "NaNaNa", which featured Diho and Białas. In 2017, Sentino was kicked off the GM2L ("Get Money Live Life") label; afterwards, Malik would take over the label. 

Malik Montana released Tijara in 2018; it peaked at number two on OLiS and was certified gold by the Polish Society of the Phonographic Industry. He also released several songs certified gold by the ZPAV, with "Mówili" certified as 2× platinum. In 2019, he released Import/Export, which peaked at number three on OLiS and was certified platinum. He also released "Jagodzianki" the same year, which featured Mr. Polska and was certified 4× platinum.

In 2021, Malik Montana announced an album with guest appearances from only French rappers; it is to be named WAW CDG, after Warsaw Chopin Airport and Charles de Gaulle Airport. He also performed at the Wrocław Hip Hop Festival.

In 2023, Malik Montana released Adwokat Diabla, which included features from Fivio Foreign, NLE Choppa and Headie One.

Tijara Mobile 
Malik established Tijara Mobile, a phone network, on 4 February 2020. The purpose of the network was to interact with fans; the network provided SMS and voicemail services, as well as announcements regarding contests and events involving Malik Montana.

Tijara Mobile went defunct in November 2021.

Discography

Albums

Singles

References

Musicians from Hamburg
Polish rappers
1989 births
Living people
Polish people of German descent
Polish people of Greek descent
German people of Afghan descent
Musicians from Warsaw